Andrew Heo (born March 7, 2001) is an American short track speed skater. He represented the United States at the 2022 Winter Olympics.

Career
Heo won a bronze medal at the 2020 Four Continents Short Track Speed Skating Championships in the 5000 metre relay.

Heo represented the United States at the 2022 Winter Olympics in the men's 1000 metres.

Heo won a silver medal at the 2023 Four Continents Short Track Speed Skating Championships in the 500 metres.

Personal life
Heo's older brother, Aaron, is a short track speed skater and represented the United States at the 2016 Winter Youth Olympics.

References

External links

2001 births
Living people
American male short track speed skaters
Four Continents Short Track Speed Skating Championships medalists
Short track speed skaters at the 2022 Winter Olympics
Sportspeople from Pennsylvania
Olympic short track speed skaters of the United States
American sportspeople of Korean descent